Devario fangfangae is a freshwater fish endemic to the Nam Kading drainage in Laos.

References

Cyprinid fish of Asia
Fish of Laos
Fish described in 2000
Devario